Monte Hale (born Samuel Buren Ely June 8, 1919 – March 29, 2009) was an American B-Western film star and country musician.

Biography

Sometimes reported to have been born in San Angelo, Texas, Hale was actually born in Ada, Oklahoma but grew up in Shawnee, Oklahoma, attending Washington Grade School and Shawnee High School. (Texas birthplace reportedly sounded better for the movies). After working as a laborer at various jobs in Ada and Enid OK Herod Ely settled in Shawnee and became an evangelist with the Church of God. His oldest son, Buren, was known to use his musical talent during his father's services.  The boy had gathered pecans and picked cotton to earn money to buy his first guitar. Soon he was singing and playing the guitar wherever he could find an audience. His parents had divorced and both had remarried with youngest brother Bobby going with his mother.  In 1934 16-year-old Buren left home as many boys did during the Depressions. He headed for Houston and found work playing his music. From there he went to Albuquerque working on a radio station. A man there convinced him to head to California but all he was able to do there was scratch together a small band and play at a winter resort dude ranch. After four years he returned to with the Texas Vaudeville and local rodeo shows. During World War II he got a job as a replacement guitarist with the Stars Over Texas Bond Drive joining several Republic Pictures celebrities and staff.  This introduced him to western stars like Chill Wills and convinced Phil Isley to recommended him to Herbert Yates, head of Republic Pictures. Yates agreed to "test" him but he must fund his own trip. Some friends gave him $200 and he flew to Los Angeles.

It was 1944 and he signed with the company for seven years and changed his name from Buren Ely to "Monte Hale". He soon starred in his first major role in Home on the Range. He appeared in some of the first westerns filmed in color and was given use of Roy Rogers' musical sidekicks, the "Sons of the Pioneers" for one of his movies. He was often cast as a young cowboy with cameos by Don Barry, Allen Lane and Roy Rogers and Dale Evans. Hale then played more traditional Western heroes in films set in the late 19th century. By 1947 the formula was set with Paul Hurst joining the series as Hale's sidekick and Riders of the Purple Sage providing the music. At this point he ceased playing the character named for himself.

In 1948 he made a trip back to see friends and family in his hometown of Shawnee plus appearances in 18 other Oklahoma towns to promote his latest movie, Son of God's Country. He reported that he had to leave his horse Pardner behind.

Hale was also a recording star and appeared in a series of Western comics published by Fawcett Comics. Beginning in 1948 Hale had his own title with more than 50 issues. In fact, his comic book stardom lasted longer than his film stardom. Republic began cutting back on the Western genre moving to television. He finished his Republic contract with an appearance in the Roy Rogers-Dale Evans movies Trail of Robin Hood with fellow Republic stars Rex Allen and Rocky Lane.

Hale made many public appearances at rodeos and other Western shows. He played a villain role in the 1954's Yukon Vengeance. His last movie appearance was in Giant in 1956, where part of his job was to teach James Dean to use a lariat. He appeared in a few television roles and movies up until 1966. On November 12, 2004, for his work in movies, he received a star on the Hollywood Walk of Fame. He was also instrumental in the foundation of what is now the Autry National Center of the American West.

Played “Sergeant” on "Gunsmoke" in the 1959 episode “Blue Horse” (S4E38).

In 1998, a Golden Palm Star on the Palm Springs, California, Walk of Stars was dedicated to him.

Death
He died at 89 in Studio City, California after a long illness; he was survived by his wife of 31 years, Joanne. He was buried at the Forest Lawn Memorial Park in Hollywood Hills, California.

Filmography

Notes

External links
 
 
 Monte Hale at B-Westerns

American country singer-songwriters
Singing cowboys
Male Western (genre) film actors
1919 births
2009 deaths
Male actors from Oklahoma
Singer-songwriters from Oklahoma
People from Ada, Oklahoma
Vaudeville performers
Burials at Forest Lawn Memorial Park (Hollywood Hills)
20th-century American singers
Country musicians from Oklahoma
20th-century American male singers
American male singer-songwriters